Wood-ear or tree ear (Korean: 목이 버섯), also translated wood jellyfish or , can refer to a few similar-looking edible fungi used primarily in Chinese cuisine; these are commonly sold in Asian markets shredded and dried.

 Auricularia heimuer (黑木耳, black ear fungus), previously misdetermined as Auricularia auricula-judae
 Auricularia cornea (毛木耳, cloud ear fungus), also called Auricularia polytricha
 Tremella fuciformis (银耳, white/silver ear fungus)

The black and cloud ear fungi are black in appearance and closely related. The white ear fungus is superficially similar but has important ecological, taxonomical, and culinary differences.

Chinese edible mushrooms